Jagannath Majumdar (1911–1998) was a freedom fighter in British India and a political leader after Indian Independence from Nadia, West Bengal. He was a part of the Indian National Congress and was a 3 term member of the West Bengal Legislative Assembly.

Elections

In 1951 Majumdar represented Nakashipara in the 1st West Bengal Legislative Assembly and was a part of the Bidhan Chandra Roy government. He was a member of the 2nd West Bengal Legislative Assembly winning from Krishnanagar in 1957. In the 1962 West Bengal Legislative Assembly election he lost the Krishnanagar constituency to the Praja Socialist Party candidate Kashi Kanta Maitra.

Formation of Bangla Congress

In 1966 the left leaning wing of the West Bengal Pradesh Congress, represented by Ajoy Mukherjee, Pranab Mukherjee, Siddhartha Shankar Ray, A. B. A. Ghani Khan Choudhury, Abha Maiti revolted against the leadership of the old conservative elites of "the syndicate" like Prafulla Chandra Sen and Atulya Ghosh owing to the policies of the Prafulla Sen government during the Food Movement. As a result the Bangla Congress was formed through a split in the Indian National Congress in West Bengal in May, 1966. The Party had a strong base in Midnapore, Hooghly, Nadia, Murshidabad and all of North Bengal. A big plank was development of rural areas and small towns as opposed to the Calcutta-obsessed approach of the Congress-led West Bengal Government. Going into the 1967 elections, there were two fronts opposing the Indian National Congress, the United Left Front led by the Communist Party of India (Marxist) and the People's United Left Front comprising Bangla Congress, Communist Party of India and the All India Forward Bloc. 

Majumdar fought the 1967 elections as a Bangla Congress candidate for the People's United Left Front and won from Chapra. Shortly after the elections, the 2 fronts came together to form the United Front and dislodge the Indian National Congress for the first time in West Bengal since independence. The United Front formed government on an 18-Point Programme with Ajoy Mukherjee as the Chief Minister and Jyoti Basu as the Deputy Chief Minister in March 1967.

Legacy

In 1972, marking the 25th year of Indian Independence, Majumdar was awarded the Tamra Patra for outstanding contribution to the freedom movement by then Prime Minister Indira Gandhi. He is the father of Jay Prakash Majumdar, State Vice President of All India Trinamool Congress.

References 

Indian National Congress politicians from West Bengal
1911 births
1998 deaths
Indian independence activists from West Bengal
People from Nadia district
West Bengal MLAs 1951–1957
West Bengal MLAs 1957–1962
West Bengal MLAs 1967–1969